PRHS may refer to one of the following high schools:

Palmetto Ridge High School in Orangetree, Florida, USA
Park Ridge High School in Park Ridge, New Jersey, USA
Parrsboro Regional High School in Parrsboro, Nova Scotia, Canada
Paso Robles High School in Paso Robles, California, USA
Paul Robeson High School (disambiguation), multiple schools
Peachtree Ridge High School in Suwanee, Georgia, USA
Pearl River High School (disambiguation), multiple schools
Pentucket Regional High School in West Newbury, Massachusetts, USA
Pinelands Regional High School in Tuckerton, New Jersey, USA
Pine-Richland High School in Gibsonia, Pennsylvania, USA
Plymouth Regional High School in Plymouth, New Hampshire, USA
Porter Ridge High School in Union County, North Carolina, USA
Prairie Ridge High School in Crystal Lake, Illinois, USA